The Wrong Mans is a British BBC Television comedy-drama series, co-produced with the American online television provider Hulu. It premiered on BBC Two on 24 September 2013 and in the United States on 11 November 2013. Considered a critical and ratings success, it was co-created and written by Gavin & Stacey alumni James Corden and Mathew Baynton as an attempt to combine the situation comedy format with the intricate plotting and storytelling tropes of an action-adventure series.

A two-part sequel series aired on BBC Two in the runup to Christmas 2014, with Hulu broadcasting the same series in four parts on Christmas Eve.

In 2018, it was announced that an American remake of the show was being produced for Showtime by J. J. Abrams's Bad Robot and BBC Studios. However, the pilot was later cancelled by Showtime.

Premise
Berkshire County Council worker Sam Pinkett and Phil Bourne, who doesn't work for the council but works inside the building, become entangled in a far-fetched web of crime, conspiracy and corruption after Sam answers a ringing mobile phone at the site of a car crash.

Cast
 Mathew Baynton as Samuel James Pinkett
 James Corden as Philip Neville Bourne
 Sarah Solemani as Lizzie Green
 Tom Basden as Noel Ward
 Paul Cawley as Alan
 Chandeep Uppal as Sabrina
 Dawn French as Linda Bourne
 Nick Moran as Nick Stevens 
 Emilia Fox as Scarlett Stevens 
 David Calder as Mr. Reid 
 Benedict Wong as Mr Lau
 Andrew Koji as Jason Lau
 Christina Chong as May Wu
 Dougray Scott as Agent Jack Walker
 Stephen Campbell Moore as Paul Smoke
 Karel Roden as Marat Malankovic
 Duncan Pow as Petr
 Alec Utgoff as Yuri & Dimitri
 Rebecca Front as Cox
 Rowena King as Wood
 Ray Panthaki as Khalil (Series 2)
 Anastasia Griffith as Agent Miller (Series 2)
 Bertie Carvel as Nathan Cross (Series 2)
 Raoul Trujillo as Carlos Espinoza (Series 2)
 John Ross Bowie as Dave Kinsman (Series 2)
 Samantha Spiro as Maria (Series 2)
 Rosa Whitcher as Rosa (Series 2)
 Trevor Cooper as Guard Harry (Series 2)

Production
On 9 October 2012, BBC Two controller Janice Hadlow announced The Wrong Mans as a co-production between BBC In-House Comedy and Hulu. The series was commissioned by Janice Hadlow and Cheryl Taylor. A pilot based on Baynton and Corden's initial series pitch had previously been shot in 2010; some elements were retained for what eventually became the first episode of the full series, including a cameo from David Harewood. Principal filming on the series began in January 2013, at the same time as the cast was announced. Jeremy Dyson was the script editor for the series.

The idea for the series initially arose out of a conversation between Corden and Baynton on the set of Gavin & Stacey, four years earlier, regarding the apparent scarcity of TV sitcoms with the same level of intricate, meaningful plotting as then-current dramatic hits 24 and Lost. As a starting-point for their own half-hour comedy show pitch to the BBC, the duo were further inspired by the Coen Brothers' film Burn After Reading, with its central concept of ordinary characters obviously out of their depth in a standard action-movie scenario. The humour in their new TV series, Baynton and Corden decided, would arise not so much from deliberate jokes as from the sheer realistic ineptitude of the heroes' attempts to cope with a high-stakes melodrama constantly snowballing further out of their control.

Once they began actually writing the series, the two quickly realised this would mean carrying through a much more ambitious project than they had anticipated, eventually leading to a significant amount of effort spent attempting to work out a believably complex, well-paced thriller plot. Producer/director Jim Field Smith described the result as a "movie broken into six parts", and in filming aimed for a likewise ambitious fusion of the realistic and cinematic, insisting that the thriller elements be played entirely straight.

Regarding the apparently awkward title, Corden explained that the extra and ungrammatical "s" was deliberately placed "to let you know it's a comedy show. If it was a drama, it'd be called The Wrong Man."

Despite the first series' apparently self-contained storyline, as of the midpoint of its initial airing, BBC executives had already confirmed that "there is a desire to bring it back and discussions are ongoing". Immediately post-finale, both co-creators and Field Smith confirmed their interest in returning, on Twitter and during media appearances. Baynton said in an interview shortly thereafter that they had come up with what they thought was a plausible way to continue the same duo's adventures for a second series. In February 2014, Baynton said that he and Corden had finished plotting the new series and were about to start work on the scripts. In April 2014, BBC Two officially announced that a second series had been commissioned.

Filming began on the new series in August 2014, with Field Smith returning as producer/director.  The new plotline was conceived as a direct continuation of the events of the first, using a deliberately hanging plot thread—the bomb seen planted under a car in the final shot—as the starting-point in a storyline that charted the duo's equally outlandish attempts to reclaim their ordinary lives. Describing their efforts in comparison to the original, Corden and Baynton reiterated that "this new series is bigger and bolder... If series one was the frying pan, this is the fire." Other returning cast members include Dawn French, Rebecca Front, Sarah Solemani and Tom Basden, all reprising their roles from the first series. BBC Two scheduled the new series as part of their 2014 Christmas programming line-up, running the episodes in two hour-long blocks successively on 22 and 23 December. The same episodes broken into four half-hours subsequently premiered on Hulu.com on 24 December.

Episode list

Series 1 (2013)

Series 2 (2014)

Reception

Ratings
Overnight figures showed that the first episode was watched by 13.5% of the UK viewing audience at the time, or 3.08 million, making it BBC Two's most successful comedy debut since Extras eight years previously. Consolidated audience was 4.5 million, or 16%. Series consolidated viewing average was 3.3 million viewers or 12%, while the Sunday 10pm repeat averaged 494,000/2%.

In the US, Hulu initially launched the series by making either the first two episodes available to regular subscribers with one episode subsequently released each week, or all six immediately available to Hulu Plus subscribers. CEO Mike Hopkins confirmed that each episode ranked among the ten most-watched on the online service upon weekly release.

Critical response
Initial UK reviews for the series were generally positive. It was ranked No. 5 in Radio Times''' annual critics' Top 40 TV series for 2013 and the first episode was an iTunes UK Editor's Choice as the same year's Best TV Episode. On making its Hulu debut, the show received an aggregate score of 80/100 from Metacritic based on seven major reviews, placing it in the top ten highest-rated series of the US fall season.

Praise for the "darkly comic caper", as Keith Watson described it for Metro, centred around both the moody, heavily stylised visual feel of the overall production and the contrasting comic chemistry between its two leads. "The mismatched buddy dynamic between the pair – nerdy, neurotic everyman and chubby gung-ho sidekick – was reminiscent of the Simon Pegg/Nick Frost Britcoms or a Coen Brothers flick," wrote Michael Hogan in The Daily Telegraph. Ellen Jones from The Independent said: "Thanks to slick direction and, one suspects, a large chunk of the BBC's autumn budget, it certainly looks as good as a Hollywood thriller."

Veteran TV writer Clive James of The Daily Telegraph said The Wrong Mans is "highly recognisable, as if it had been designed to fulfill all the requirements of British screen comedy... Remember Morecambe and Wise on the Riviera? This is the same thing, but better done. Having watched one episode, I vowed to watch another: instead of, as I usually do when a British comedy series is concerned, vowing to emigrate back to Australia."

Writing for the entertainment website HitFix, American veteran reviewer Alan Sepinwall noted that "I expected to be tired of the joke behind "The Wrong Mans" within an episode or two. Instead, I found myself engrossed enough in the story of who wanted Sam dead at any particular moment, and why, to keep watching until I made it all the way to the end and could appreciate just how well Baynton, Corden and company stuck the landing."

Several reviewers nevertheless felt the show's attempt to seamlessly mesh the comedy and thriller genres wasn't entirely successful, including Rachel Cooke in the New Statesman, who wrote that "I didn’t hate it... but all the same, I’m not sure that it quite works. Thirty minutes seems too short a time to accommodate both the tropes of a thriller and a tonne of jokes. I think they should have given themselves an hour, the better that the audience might get its ear in.". Sam Wollaston in The Guardian wrote that he was "not convinced" by the series' tone, "nor that performers (mainly) necessarily make the best writers. Oh, and what's with that title? There's something wrong with it, isn't there? Grammatically?"

Awards and nominations
Baynton and Corden, with Tom Basden, won a 2014 Royal Television Society (RTS) Programme Award for Best Writer – Comedy. Baynton and Corden also received a BAFTA TV Craft Award nomination in the same category, and both were also nominated for Best Male Performance in a Comedy Programme in the same year's BAFTA Television Awards.

At the 2015 BAFTA TV Awards, the show received a nomination in the Best Scripted Comedy category.

Home media
DVD and Blu-ray Disc editions of the first series were released in the UK on 4 November 2013. The second series was released onto DVD in the UK on 26 January 2015.

A boxset containing the first and second series of The Wrong Mans'' was also released in the UK on 26 January 2015.

References

External links
 
 
 The Wrong Mans at Radio Times
 
 The Wrong Mans at Hulu
 Behind the scenes pictures

2013 British television series debuts
2014 British television series endings
2010s British comedy-drama television series
British comedy-drama television shows
English-language television shows
Television shows set in Berkshire
BBC television comedy
BBC television dramas
Hulu original programming
Television series by BBC Studios